This is a list of diplomatic missions of Zambia, excluding honorary consulates.

Current missions

Africa

Americas

Asia

Europe

Oceania

Multilateral organizations

Gallery

Closed missions

Americas

See also 
 Foreign relations of Zambia
 Visa policy of Zambia

Notes

References

External links
 Zambian National Tourist Board

 
Diplomatic missions
Zambia